Hendrix in the West is a live album  by Jimi Hendrix, released posthumously in January 1972 by Polydor Records (UK), and in February by Reprise Records (US). The album tracks are split between those recorded in 1969 by the Jimi Hendrix Experience with bassist Noel Redding and drummer Mitch Mitchell and in 1970 with Billy Cox and Mitchell during The Cry of Love Tour.

Recording
The album contains songs from Hendrix's performances at the Royal Albert Hall on February 24, 1969, the San Diego Sports Arena on May 24, 1969, Berkeley Community Theatre on May 30, 1970 and the Isle of Wight Festival on August 30, 1970.  The album's credits mislabel "Little Wing" and "Voodoo Child" as being recorded in San Diego, but actually they were recorded at the Royal Albert Hall on February 24, 1969.

Critical reception and charts

In a review for AllMusic, Sean Westergaard gave the album four out of five stars.  He notes the relatively rare performances of "God Save the Queen", "Sgt. Pepper's Lonely Hearts Club Band", "Blue Suede Shoes" and "Johnny B. Goode" as adding to Hendrix's more typical concert material.

Hendrix in the West reached No. 7 in the UK albums chart, and No. 12 on both the U.S. Best Selling Soul LP's and the Billboard 200 charts.

1971 album track listing
All songs were written by Hendrix, except where noted. The album details are taken from the original 1971 Reprise LP record labels. The original UK Polydor release reverses the sides, with "Johnny B. Goode" opening side one and "The Queen" side two. Both the Reprise and Polydor album liner notes list the tracks in a different order than the actual LPs.

2011 re-release

Hendrix in the West was re-released on September 13, 2011, as part of Experience Hendrix's project to remaster Hendrix's discography. Since the rights to the Royal Albert Hall performances that appear on the original LP are in dispute, the re-release substitutes the recordings of "Little Wing" (3:52) from Winterland on October 12, 1968, and "Voodoo Child" (10:40) from the San Diego Sports Arena on May 24, 1969.

Personnel
Jimi Hendrixguitar, vocals
Mitch Mitchelldrums
Noel Reddingbass guitar (1968–1969 tracks)
Billy Coxbass guitar (1970 tracks)

References

1972 live albums
Jimi Hendrix live albums
Live albums published posthumously
Polydor Records live albums
Live albums recorded at the Royal Albert Hall